Darkest Day of Horror is the fourth studio album by American death metal band Mortician, released on April 22, 2003 by Relapse Records. The album takes its title from a slogan used to promote the 1985 film Day of the Dead, and was Mortician's final release for Relapse Records.

Release
Due to the cover artwork not being completed in time, the release date for Darkest Day of Horror was postponed. The album was released in two different versions. The initial release featured a simple, black-and-white packaging devoid of any artwork, bearing the subtitle "Limited Fall 2002 US Tour Edition" on its cover. These were pressed so that the band could sell the album while on tour. The other edition was the intended release, with complete artwork and packaging.

Track listing

Personnel
Mortician
Will Rahmer - bass, vocals
Roger J. Beaujard - guitar, drum programming

Production
Roger Beaujard - producer, engineer
Will Rahmer - assistant engineer
Matthew F. Jacobson - executive producer
Frank White - photography
Jonathan Canady - design
Wes Benscoter - cover art

References 

Mortician (band) albums
2003 albums
Albums with cover art by Wes Benscoter